Skye is an eastern suburb of Adelaide, South Australia. It is located in the City of Burnside.

Geography
The suburb is located in the foothills of the Adelaide Hills, in a region known as the Hills Face Zone.  It is the easternmost suburb in the Burnside council area. Most of the streets have expansive westward views over the Adelaide plains. Allotments in these streets thereby command high prices. As a result, there are many prestige residences.

Demographics

The 2006 Census by the Australian Bureau of Statistics counted 278 persons in Skye on census night. Of these, 50.4% were male and 49.6% were female.

The majority of residents (69.8%) are of Australian birth, with other common census responses being England (6.1%), Italy (5.4%), Malaysia (2.5%), Scotland (2.5%), and India (2.2%).

The age distribution of Skye residents is skewed slightly higher than the greater Australian population. 73.8% of residents were over 25 years in 2006, compared to the Australian average of 66.5%; and 26.2% were younger than 25 years, compared to the Australian average of 33.5%.

Facilities and attractions

Views
Many parts of Skye have views over Adelaide, reaching to Spencer Gulf.

Parks
There is a reserve between Wyfield Street and Knox Terrace.

Water
Supply of reticulated water has been controversial for decades, primarily due to the steepness of the streets. Previously, many allotments within the suburb have no government water supply, instead being serviced by independent water schemes sourced from bores, some being privately owned, some being co-operatives. However SA Water is now taking responsibility for the water supply with all homes expected to be connected to their systems in early 2016.

Roads
Skye is serviced by Old Norton Summit Road, connecting the suburb to Magill Road and Adelaide city centre. The loftiest (and most populous) portions of the suburb are reached by Coach Road, sections of which are quite steep. Coach Road is an extension of Norwood Parade.

See also
List of Adelaide suburbs

References

External links

Suburbs of Adelaide